The Planet Ice Silverdome Arena is a 2,000-seat multi-purpose arena in Basingstoke, England. It was built in 1988 and has an Olympic sized  ice rink. It is one of several ice skating arenas in the UK operated by the Planet Ice company. It is home to the Basingstoke Bison and Basingstoke Buffalo ice hockey teams.

The first ever hockey game played at the ice rink was between Basingstoke Beavers (now Bison) and Bournemouth Sharks, on Sunday 17 July 1988. The Beavers won the game 27-2 in front of 1,200 spectators. The first ever goal was scored by the Beavers' Don Yewchin after just 10 seconds.

Public Skating 
Basingstoke Ice Rink has public skating year round, seven days a week. Disco sessions occur every Friday at 20:00 and birthday parties can be booked for the morning and afternoon sessions all week.

Private Hire  
Hiring can be done by contacting the rink directly on a case-by-case basis.

Synchronised Skating 
The local club Basingstoke Synchronised Skating Club has 3 Synchronised Skating teams using the rink. 
Including
 Snowstorm
 Ice Angels
 Ice Age
The club is sponsored by Persimmon Homes.

The club in conjunction with the figure skating club has  won the National Team Challenge inter-rink competition 3 times in 1999, 2004 and 2009.

Figure Skating 
The rink hosts top level figure skaters including 2015/16 national champion Danielle Harrison and has 12 coaches including Andrew Place who competed in the 1992 Olympics. There is patch ice for figure skaters every morning.

The local club is Basingstoke Ice Skating Club.

It has a regular Friday night session.

The club in conjunction with the synchro skating club has  won the National Team Challenge inter-rink competition 3 times in 1999, 2004 and 2009.

Christmas Show 
The rink has a Christmas show each year with a cast of 190 for the 25th annual show in 2013, and a cast of 180 in 2014.

Ice Hockey 
The Planet Ice Silverdome Arena is home to the Basingstoke Bison and Basingstoke Buffalo with 5 Junior teams and a number of recreational teams including 
 Basingstoke Hyenas http://basingstokehyenas.co.uk/
 Basingstoke Raptors https://www.facebook.com/raptorsicehockeyclub/
 Basingstoke Cougars http://www.cougarsihc.co.uk/
 Basingstoke Barracudas https://twitter.com/cudashockey

Along with an active Stick & Puck http://www.sticknpuckbasingstoke.co.uk/

Medium Term Threat 
The ice rink is under threat of closure by the operator Planet Ice.  There are multiple petitions and an active campaign to maintain the ice rink in  Basingstoke.

References

External links
Official site

Indoor ice hockey venues in England
Sports venues in Hampshire
Sport in Basingstoke
Basingstoke Bison